Derek Carle (born 12 July 1973) was a Zimbabwean cricketer. He was a right-handed batsman and a right-arm off-break bowler who played for Mashonaland Country Districts. He was born in Salisbury (now Harare).

Carle made a single first-class appearance for the team, in 1993-94, against Mashonaland. Batting as a tailender, Carle scored 6 runs in the only innings in which he batted, and bowled seven overs during the match, taking 2-19 in the only innings in which Mashonaland batted.

External links
Derek Carle at Cricket Archive 

1973 births
Living people
Zimbabwean cricketers